Merrill Sanford (born July 17, 1947) is an American politician who served as Mayor of Juneau, Alaska from 2012 until 2015.

Early life
Merrill Sanford was born on July 17, 1947, in Bellingham, Washington. A year later, his family moved to Juneau, Alaska where he has been a resident ever since. Sanford graduated from Juneau-Douglas High School in 1966.  Before getting into politics, Sanford served in the United States Marine Corps as a helicopter mechanic in the Vietnam War for four years. Sanford also worked for the Alaska National Guard for eleven years. In addition to military service, he spent two years helping to build the Trans-Alaska Pipeline System as well as thirty years as a volunteer firefighter for Capital City Fire/Rescue, from which he retired in March 2001.

Political career
From 1998 to 2002, Sanford was a member of the Juneau Planning Commission, a department of the city government that develops city projects. From 2002 to 2012, Sanford served as a member of the Assembly of the City and Borough of Juneau, Alaska.

Mayor of Juneau
In 2012, Sanford ran for mayor of Juneau. The election was held on October 2, 2012. Sanford won a majority of the votes (55.26%) while Cheryl Jebe followed with 44.32%. The election had a 19.64% turnout.

Sanford ran for reelection in 2015, but he lost badly to challenger Greg Fisk. He took just 33% of the vote to 66% for Fisk.

See also

List of mayors of Juneau, Alaska
List of people from Bellingham, Washington

References

External links
Juneau City Assembly members

1947 births
Living people
American firefighters
Mayors of Juneau, Alaska
Borough assembly members in Alaska
Politicians from Bellingham, Washington
United States Marines
United States Marine Corps personnel of the Vietnam War